These are the squads for the countries that competed in Football at the 1980 Summer Olympics.

Algeria

Head coach: Mahieddine Khalef

Colombia

Head coach: Eduardo Retat

Costa Rica 

Head coach:  Antonio Moyano

Cuba 

Head coach:  Tibor Ivanics

Due to the boycott of the Olympics, Cuba took part in place of the US.

Czechoslovakia 

Head coach: František Havránek

East Germany 

Head coach: Rudolf Krause

Finland 

Head coach: Jukka Vakkila

Due to the boycott of the Olympics, Finland took part in place of Norway.

Iraq

Head coach:  Anwar Jassam

Due to the boycott of the Olympics, Iraq took part in place of Malaysia.

Kuwait 

Head coach:  Carlos Alberto Parreira

Nigeria

Head coach:  Otto Glória

Due to the boycott of the Olympics, Nigeria took part in place of Ghana.

Spain 

Head coach: José Santamaría

Syria

Head coach: Yousef Chadli

Due to the boycott of the Olympics, Syria took part in place of Iran.

Venezuela 

Head coach: 

Due to the boycott of the Olympics, Venezuela took part in place of Argentina.

Soviet Union 

Head coach: Konstantin Beskov

Yugoslavia

Head coach: Ivan Toplak

Zambia 

Head coach: Dick Chama

Due to the boycott of the Olympics, Zambia took part in place of Egypt.

References

External links
 FIFA pages on 1980 Olympic football tournament
 European players caps
 Olympic squads

1980 Summer Olympics
Squads